The 4th Mirchi Music Awards, presented by the Radio Mirchi, honoured the best of Hindi music from the year 2011. The ceremony was held on 21 March 2012 at the Bhavan's College Ground (Andheri), Mumbai and was hosted by Shaan and Usha Uthup. There were many performances, including those by Saif Ali Khan, Parikrama, Shreya Ghoshal, Bappi Lahiri and Mika Singh. There was a live jugalbandi featuring Shankar–Ehsaan–Loy, Lalit Pandit, Salim–Sulaiman, Ram Sampath, Sajid–Wajid and Leslie Lewis. Ash King, Harshdeep Kaur, Neha Bhasin, Anushka Manchanda, Tochi Raina, Shweta Pandit, Dominique and Clinton Cerejo, Kamal Khan, Suman Shridhar, Shefali Alvares, Benny Dayal and Ritu Pathak also performed during the award show. Rockstar won a leading five awards including Album of the Year. Song of the Year went to "Senorita" from Zindagi Na Milegi Dobara. The show was broadcast on 31 March 2012 on Colors.

Winners and nominees 

The winners were selected by the members of jury, chaired by Javed Akhtar. They met on 6 March 2012 to close in on the nominations and decide on the winners. The following are the names of nominees and winners.

(Winners are listed first, highlighted in boldface.)

Film awards

Technical awards

Non-film awards

Special awards

Listeners' Choice awards

Jury awards

Films with multiple wins and nominations

 Won two Listeners' Choice  awards

Jury 
The jury was chaired by Javed Akhtar and had a total of 18 members. Other members were:

 Aadesh Shrivastava - music composer and singer
 Alka Yagnik - playback singer
 Anu Malik - music director
 Ashutosh Gowariker - director, writer and producer
 Ila Arun - actress and folk singer
 Lalit Pandit - composer
 Kailash Kher - singer
 Kavita Krishnamurthy - playback singer
 Louis Banks - composer, record producer and singer
 Prasoon Joshi - lyricist and screenwriter
 Ramesh Sippy - director and producer
 Sadhana Sargam - playback singer
 Sameer - lyricist
 Shankar Mahadevan - composer and playback singer
 Sooraj Barjatya - director, producer and screenwriter
 Suresh Wadkar - playback singer
 Talat Aziz - singer

See also 
 Mirchi Music Awards

References

Music Mirchi Awards 
 Music Mirchi Awards Official Website
 Music Mirchi Awards 2011

Mirchi Music Awards